Lakeview is a city in Baxter County, Arkansas, United States. The population was 741 at the 2010 census.

Geography
Lakeview is located at  (36.377358, -92.534738).

Only Highway 

 Arkansas Highway 178

School District
Lakeview is in the Mountain Home School District.
The site of the proposed town was first settled in the mid-1880s and was called Trimble Flat, for the Trimble family, first settlers on the flat fertile plateau overlooking the White Rivaer. When the school, Baxter County District No. 25, and the post office were established, they were called Amos. The community, church and cemetery remained Trimble Flat.

Demographics

As of the census of 2010, there were 883 people, 402 households, and 282 families residing in the city. The racial makeup of the city was 98.95% White, 0.39% Native American, 0.52% Asian, 0.13% from other races.  1.31% of the population were Hispanic or Latino of any race.

There were 372 households, out of which 14.0% had children under the age of 18 living with them, 64.2% were married couples living together, 2.2% had a female householder with no husband present, and 32.0% were non-families. 28.2% of all households were made up of individuals, and 15.9% had someone living alone who was 65 years of age or older.  The average household size was 2.05 and the average family size was 2.45.

In the city, the population was spread out, with 13.6% under the age of 18, 3.5% from 18 to 24, 14.3% from 25 to 44, 30.4% from 45 to 64, and 38.1% who were 65 years of age or older.  The median age was 60 years. For every 100 females, there were 102.9 males.  For every 100 females age 18 and over, there were 101.5 males.

The median income for a household in the city was $31,667, and the median income for a family was $38,482. Males had a median income of $27,750 versus $25,313 for females. The per capita income for the city was $16,667.  About 7.9% of families and 12.1% of the population were below the poverty line, including 19.6% of those under age 18 and 4.1% of those age 65 or over.

Notable person

Karen Hopper, Republican former member of the Arkansas House of Representatives for District 100, resides in Lakeview.

See also
Lake View, Arkansas

References

External links
 Map of Lakeview (US Census Bureau)
 Map of Baxter County (US Census Bureau)
 Mountain Home School District
 Baxter County Historical and Genealogical Society

Cities in Baxter County, Arkansas
Cities in Arkansas